Ain't a Damn Thang Changed is the debut studio album by American rap group WC and the Maad Circle, released in 1991. The songs on the album describe life in Los Angeles as experienced by African Americans in the early 1990s.

The album peaked at No. 52 on the Top R&B/Hip-Hop Albums chart.

Track listing

Personnel
 Anthony Wheaton - producer (tracks 1, 2, 4-5, 7-8, 10-17)
 Big Gee - additional vocals (tracks 5, 8, 10-11)
 Derrick A. Baker - producer (track 13), co-producer (tracks 2, 4, 7, 11)
 Dino Paredes - artwork
 Lamar Dupré Calhoun - producer (tracks 1, 6, 9, 12-13), co-producer (tracks 2, 4, 5, 11, 15), scratches
 Manuel Donayre - illustration (logo)
 Mike Miller - photography
 O'Shea Jackson - album overseen, additional vocals (track 13)
 William Calhoun, Jr. - producer (tracks 2, 4-5, 7-8, 10-11, 15-16), rap vocals

References

1991 debut albums
Priority Records albums
WC and the Maad Circle albums